Senator Apodaca may refer to:

Jerry Apodaca (born 1934), New Mexico State Senate
Tom Apodaca (born 1957), North Carolina State Senate